Upphärad is a locality situated in Trollhättan Municipality, Västra Götaland County, Sweden with 588 inhabitants in 2010.

References 

Populated places in Västra Götaland County
Populated places in Trollhättan Municipality